Hatfield is a civil parish in the East Riding of Yorkshire, England.

The civil parish was formed in 1935 from the merger of the parishes of Great Hatfield, Goxhill and Little Hatfield.

According to the 2011 UK census, Hatfield parish had a population of 249, a decrease on the 2001 UK census figure of 258.

References

Civil parishes in the East Riding of Yorkshire